The state of Alabama includes over 30 shopping malls. The largest in the state is Riverchase Galleria in Hoover, Alabama.

Defunct
 Westlake Mall, Bessemer (1969–2009)
 Century Plaza, Birmingham (1975–May 31, 2009)
 Eastwood Mall, Birmingham (1960–2006)
 Northside Mall, Dothan
 Porter Square Mall, Dothan
 Dunnavant's Mall, Huntsville
 Heart of Huntsville Mall, Huntsville (1961–2007)
 The Mall, Huntsville
 Springdale Mall, Mobile
 Montgomery Mall, Montgomery (1970–2008)
 Normandale Shopping Center, Montgomery
 Meadowbrook Mall, Tuscaloosa
 Vestavia Mall, Vestavia Hills
 McFarland Mall (February 19, 1969 – September 1, 2016)
 Madison Square Mall, Huntsville (August 1, 1984 – January 29, 2017)

References

Alabama

Shopping malls